This is a list of notable Nigerian highlife musicians arranged in alphabetical order. There are several genres of music in Nigeria. These include Fuji music, Jùjú music, Apala, Were music and Highlife. Although Highlife originated in Ghana, the genre has spread across west African countries including Nigeria.

B 

 Babá Ken Okulolo
 Bobby Benson
 Bright Chimezie
 Bola Johnson

C 
 Chief Stephen Osita Osadebe
 The Cavemen

D 
 Dr Sir Warrior

E 
 Ebenezer Obey

F 
 Fatai Rolling Dollar
 Fela Kuti
 Femi Kuti
 Fela Sowande
 Flavour N'abania

I 
 I. K. Dairo

O 
 Orlando Owoh
 Oliver De Coque
 Oriental Brothers
 Osita Osadebe
 Orlando Julius Ekemode

P 
 Prince Nico Mbarga

R 
 Rex Lawson
 Roy Chicago

S 
 Seun Kuti
 Sunny Ade

V 
 Victor Olaiya
 Victor Uwaifo

W 
 Wilberforce Echezona

See also 
 List of juju musicians

References 

Highlife
Nigerian highlife musicians